Colasanti is a surname. Notable people with the surname include:

Marina Colasanti (born 1937), Brazilian writer, translator, and journalist
Maurizio Colasanti, Italian conductor
Susane Colasanti, American novelist
Veniero Colasanti (1910–1996), Italian costume designer, set decorator, and art director